Neil Charles Gray (born 16 March 1986) is a Scottish politician who has served as Minister for Culture, Europe and International Development since 2022. A member of the Scottish National Party (SNP), he has been the Member of the Scottish Parliament (MSP) for Airdrie & Shotts since 2021, having previously been an Member of Parliament (MP) for the equivalent Westminster seat from 2015 to 2021.

Early life
Gray was born and brought up in Orkney, and was educated at Kirkwall Grammar School. He graduated from the University of Stirling in 2008 with a first-class Bachelor of Arts Honours degree in politics and journalism.

Following his graduation, Gray was employed as a producer and reporter with BBC Radio Orkney from 2003 until 2008.

Political career

Early years 
Gray worked as a press and research intern for the SNP parliamentary group at the Scottish Parliament. Grey was also employed by Alex Neil MSP from 2008, being appointed as constituency office manager in 2011.

The selection process for the Airdrie SNP candidacy, which Neil Gray ultimately won, was not without controversy. Former diplomat Craig Murray was nominated as a potential candidate at an Airdrie Branch meeting but did not make the final list as he failed SNP candidate vetting, whereupon he commented that "I think in both Airdrie & Shotts and in Falkirk it's evident who the party hierarchy wants to be the candidate." Former Policeman and SNP Councillor Alan Beveridge resigned from the party in February 2015 after Neil Gray was selected, claiming that there was a "climate of fear, intimidation and false allegations within the party" which were highlighted in the selection process.

Westminster; 2015–2021 

In September 2016, Gray as a member of the new Joint Committee on the Palace of Westminster proposed "the Joint Committee declines to consider a draft Report until it has given full consideration to the possibility of constructing a permanent new Parliamentary building, while finding an alternative future use for the Palace of Westminster; notes that this option was included in the Pre-Feasibility Study and Preliminary Strategic Business Case published in October 2012 but was rejected by the House of Commons Commission and the House of Lords House Committee at that stage; and resolves to apply the same rigorous scrutiny to the possible construction of a new Parliamentary building as it has applied to the other options for delivering the Restoration and Renewal Programme, before making a recommendation about the best option for carrying out the works"; the committee voted 11–1 against this proposal.

In 2017, he held Airdrie and Shotts with a significantly reduced majority of 195 votes, although he did increase that in the 2019 general election to a stronger majority of 5,000 votes over the second-placed Labour candidate.

Gray has campaigned extensively in support of Roadchef employees, and former employees, who have waited over 20 years for the repayment of money wrongly appropriated by former executive Tim Ingram Hill. On 8 January 2020, he questioned the Prime Minister on the issue, receiving an assurance that the Chancellor would "discuss" the matter with him.

In November 2020, Gray announced that he would be resigning as an MP in order to try and win a seat in the Scottish Parliament at the 2021 Scottish Parliament election. On 23 March 2021, he made his final speech in the House of Commons, and was appointed Steward and Bailiff of the Manor of Northstead a day later. He is the only SNP member to have held that notional office. North Lanarkshire Council calculated that his decision to resign as an MP and trigger a by-election cost taxpayers £175,000.

Election to Holyrood 
On 7 May 2021, Gray was elected as the MSP for Airdrie and Shotts, finishing ahead of former Scottish Labour leader, Richard Leonard. Following his election, Gray said, as deputy convener of his the SNP's Social Justice and Fairness Commission, that a couple with two children in an independent Scotland could be guaranteed a minimum income of £37,000 annually by the state. He admitted that he had not costed the proposal.

In a ministerial reshuffle on 24 January 2022, Gray was appointed as Minister for Culture, Europe and International Development.

Personal life
Outside politics Gray was formerly a keen athlete, representing Scotland in the 400 m, until a serious knee injury ended his career in athletics.

Neil has three daughters and one son with his wife, Karlie.

See also
Parliament of the United Kingdom relocation

References

External links 

 

 
 SNP profile
 

1986 births
Living people
Ministers of the Scottish Government
Alumni of the University of Stirling
BBC newsreaders and journalists
Members of the Parliament of the United Kingdom for Scottish constituencies
People from Kirkwall
Scottish journalists
Scottish National Party MPs
UK MPs 2015–2017
UK MPs 2017–2019
UK MPs 2019–present
Scottish National Party MSPs
Members of the Scottish Parliament 2021–2026
People associated with North Lanarkshire